Uładzimir Katkoŭski (June 19, 1976, Minsk – May 25, 2007) was a Belarusian blogger, web designer and website creator.

Biography
Katkoŭski took a degree in computer science at the American University in Bulgaria in Blagoevgrad and later worked as an IT specialist in Budapest and in Frankfurt am Main. From 2002, he worked for the Belarusian edition of Radio Free Europe.

On June 16, 2006, he and his wife had a car accident on a street in Prague. Katkoŭski was in a coma for almost a year until he died on May 26, 2007.

Activity on the Internet
In the mid-1990s, Katkoŭski became one of the pioneers of the Belarusian speaking Internet. In the late 1990s, together with his future wife and other Belarusian Internet users, he created the Belarusian historical website Litvania that had notable popularity. Katkoŭski was one of the first and most popular bloggers in Belarusian language known as rydel23. In 2006, he was awarded by the Belarusian top web portal TUT.by for his blog br23.net.

Katkoŭski created the websites Pravapis.org (about issues concerning Belarusian language) and Martyraloh Biełarusi - "The Belarusian Martyrologe" about victims of Stalinist terror in Belarus. He translated the interface of Google into Belarusian, and was one of the founders of the Belarusian Wikipedia.

He was the creator and administrator of the website of the Belarusian edition of Radio Free Europe.

See also
 List of Wikipedia people

References

External links
 Blog by Uładzimir Katkoŭski, in Belarusian and English
 Rydel's blog
 Pravapis.org
 "Litvania, the land of litvins"
 An obituary, Radio Free Europe Belarusian edition

Belarusian bloggers
Pedestrian road incident deaths
1976 births
2007 deaths
Wikipedia people
Road incident deaths in the Czech Republic
People from Minsk